Nguyễn Thị Hiền Thục (born 13 May 1981), stage name Hien Thuc, is a contemporary Vietnamese pop singer. She took a break from her music career to start a family from 2002 to 2004. She is known to have diversity styles which is mostly pop as well as being famous for several ballad songs.

She was one of four judges on The Voice of Vietnam Kids in 2013.

Family 
Her full name is Nguyễn Thị Hiền Thục born on May 13, 1981. Her mother is a high school teacher, she has an elder sister and brother; he passed away due to an accident at the age of 22.

Career

Debut 
At the age of 8, she was already accustomed to stage performance. Being the youngest child and exposing her interest in singing, despite family difficulty, her parents sent her to District 1's Children Culture House under the instruction of teacher Le Vinh Phuc. Due to her crystal and innocent voice alongside the confidence of a little girl, she was chosen to be a member of Son Ca team, that later she often had the chance to performance and became well liked by other children. At the age of 10, she was a little star three years in a row (1990, 1991, 1992) she always won the top prize of solo performance at many national children song contests.

During her school time at Le Quy Don High School, she no longer participated in many singing activities as much as before. At the age of 16, she was the top graduate of Ho Chi Minh Music Institute (same class with My Tam and Pham Thanh Thao). She began professional career and used to cooperate with Ballad Song Center of Ho Chi Minh City.

With the foundation from early age and impressive performing style, she was expected to be one of the top pop singers of Ho Chi Minh City. In 1999, she won gold medal and Best Performance Artist award of Asia's Voice contest in Shanghai. She released the first CD Email Tinh Yeu as a collection of favorite songs such as Cau Chuyen Tinh Toi, Chiec La Dau Tien, Email Love. However, as her career soared, in 2002, she suddenly took a break due to personal issues.

2004-2010 
During first day of the comeback, she struggled to overcome the stigma of being a single mother at that time, as well as having faded due to the abundant new talent. She began performing again at tearooms and bars and in small shows.

In 2004, she officially returned with the album Vol. 2 - Kim, which was not a hit. The rock alternative song Mot Ngay Ta Xa Nhau of the album Kim was quite well liked later and it was still performed by her. The failure of this album encouraged her to produce more products. In next two years, a series of albums based on five elements such as Bao (Thuy), Q (Tho), Hoa and Moc were released. In 2005, she released the single Dau Co Loi Lam which was composed by Ho Hoai Anh. This was her hit and it was charted in many music charts. Her name started to be mentioned again alongside the song rather than the curiosity of her personal life previously.

With five elements project, she proved herself to be an enthusiastic singer with the acoustic album Moc which received positive feedback from the audience and professionals. The album consisted ballad songs which won Golden Album award of December 2006 and another Golden Album award of 2007 and 1,000 copies was sold. Bearing simple and soft music, feminine voice with little technique, Moc marked her maturity in image and vocal emotion of hers.

In 2007, she started the project named Diamond which was still the same style as Moc and new experience in remixing. Diamond included ballad songs from composers like Bao Chan, Ngoc Chau, Tran Thanh Son, Tang Nhat Tue, which was rated to be a successful mix of art and entertainment. As world music became more familiar, all the songs were added folk music and mixed in ambient style to expand the depth of music space. However, the album produced no hit song.

Her voice during this period of time was deeper rather than her old innocent voice previously. To be working on many projects along with more artistic albums, she still managed to release Vol. 7 Sunflower which included many songs which hadn't been officially released but were often performed in music shows and on stage.

In May 2009, she released the album Portrait 17 which included least famous songs of late songwriter Trinh Cong Son. The name of album was from the portrait which was drawn by the late songwriter himself as a gift to Hien Thuc at the age of 17. She was motivated to produce Trinh's music when the song Con Tuoi Nao Cho Em in Moc album was highly complimented. Portrait 17 was also a gift for her mother who is a fan of Trinh Cong Son. The CD consisted pop, funk, semi-classical remixed songs rather than the basic style of Trinh Cong Son's song. Con Tuoi Nao Cho Em was directly taken from the previous album Moc, one third of the songs on the album were acoustic. With sweet and bright singing style and young spirit, she was well rated by the professionals and audience. The album won Golden Album award of June 2009.

She used to be starred in two TV dramas O Tro Trong Nha Minh and Lay Vo Sai Gon and also a host of Bai Hat Viet show.

2010-now 
In 2010, ballad album Taurus targeted at young audience received Favorite Album award of Green Wave Award. This was the first time she appeared in the list of Top 10 Favorite Singers of Green Wave Award. Although she had been working for years and had some success, but continued to fail at Potential Artist category since 2005. The hit Yeu Dau Theo Gio Bay of album Taurus marked her comeback to pop music since the 2000s. The song was made into a single as well as remixed in R&B, ballad, jazz and rock.

From 2010 and furthermore, her name was tied with a series of pop songs such as Mo Mot Hanh Phuc, Nhu Van Con Day, Giac Mo Ngay Xua, Yeu Dau Theo Gio Bay, Dieu Em Lo So,...

She doesn't pursue only one music genre as she wanted to achieve multi-genre singer. She was one of a few singers who could balance art and entertainment. People often considered her to be singing deep ballad songs. Her medium vocal was feminine, soft and she often adjusted her voice to fit any song.

In 2011, she released the album Thien Su as being ordered from Viet Tan Studio, which consisted love songs of Trinh Cong Son after the sudden success of Portrait 17. Thien Su was the third album that she cooperated with famous producer and guitarist from Ha Noi - Thanh Phuong, like Moc and Diamond. Unlike Portrait 17 which was mostly ballad songs about love, country and human, in Thien Su there were many familiar yet more complicated songs filled with thoughts about love and oneself. A feminine version of Hien Thuc based on the raw guitar playing of Thanh Phuong, among them were pop remixes from the production of Huyen Trung.

Early of 2012, she successfully performed the song Nhat Ky Cua Me from young composer Nguyen Van Chung. The music video which was portrayed by sand animation of Nguyen Van Chung himself and most lyrics was like from the diary of the mother-to-be until her child grows up drew much attention and many views on social media, and gained sympathy from the listeners. The song was nominated for Song of The Year award at some music awards, however it only received Favorite Song award of July of Bai Hat Yeu Thich 2012. Nhat Ky Cua Me became a well known song about familial love.

At the end of 2012, she released a pop album titled Free 3:15 pm inspired by her birth hour, this was a pop ballad album targeting at the mass audience which wasn't required more experiment and profession expectation. All the songs were composed by young composers who were also her close partners. 6 of the 14 songs on the album were hits which had been performed many times by her before being listed in the album.

In April 2013, she released the album Tam Thang Nam including unique and modern remixes of ballad and folk songs. The album was inspired from the song To Tam which had been included in the album Tho previously, and another song Phan To Tam (Ho Tinh Tam) was about the life of a singer.

In June 2013, she was the coach of The Voice Kid Vietnam first season on VTV3 channel in cooperation with Cat Tien Sa Agency. One of her team members Phuong My Chi was a runner-up who is apparently a famous kid singer specialized in southern folk songs.

On March 1, 2014, she held first ever live show of her career after 25 years as this was a part of Dau Au concert produced by VTV in cooperate with Thanh Nien Media. Dau An Hien Thuc also witnessed a mass audience to compare with previous live show. Due to the shows limited time, it barely portrayed her 25-year career but the crew showed symbols of it through the presentation of many songs based on many genres. Besides music, the live show also addressed her love and relationship with family, teachers, friends, colleagues and her members from The Voice Kid Vietnam.

Personal life 
In 2002, as her career was progressing, she suddenly announced her upcoming marriage with Tuan Thang, the leader and drummer of famous Sai Gon Boys band in the 1990s after a two-year relationship. Tuan Thang was also the manager and editor of her first CD. However, the wedding was cancelled.

Also in the same year, she temporarily stopped working to give birth at the age of 21. This was difficult for her family as her father suffered a stroke and was hospitalized. Her mother had to take care of the father as well as Hien Thuc and her sister who were both into the final stage of pregnancy.

Gia Bao is the name of her daughter, she was allowed to visit the father's family but it ended as Hien Thuc said that "their care was not genuine, so I stopped letting her visit them, also not wanting her to ever meet them again".

She was the first single mother singer in Vietnam. In 2005, thank to the encouragement from Phuong Thanh, she agreed to an interview to discuss her daughter. According to her, this event "opened a new chapter of my life".

She is a Catholic and often records many Christian songs as well as performs at the church.

Controversy

Music and image 
Beside being resemble with K-pop Queen Lee Hyo-ri, she was suspected to plagiarism the song Only One of BoA which was released as "Yeu Dau Theo Gio Bay" in 2013.

Conflict with singer Thanh Thao 
During first years of the comeback, besides personal life's issues, she faced many musical copyright issues. For instance, regarding two songs Co Don Minh Em and Khuc Tinh Sau with singer Thanh Thao. The conflict was officially clarified as her manager at that time - Trinh Tu Trung accused Thanh Thao for exclusively buying the copyright of two songs while Hien Thuc had finished recording them and was about to release the album. This put her into financial crisis.

However, according to the only statement from Thanh Thao in which she denied it, as she said that whether it was right or wrong, the composer of these songs - Phuong Uyen should be the one who clarified. When Hien Thuc announced the release of Co Don Minh Em also caused Thanh Thao some problems but she let it pass. Thanh Thao also stated that anyone can perform this song as long as they asked for permission, however Hien Thuc didn't.

In 2009, Hien Thuc performed in the live show of Han Thai Tu which was produced by Music Box Agency of Thanh Thao. However, their relationship was still not friendly. In 2011, Thanh Thao invited her to perform at the show Ngan Sao Hoi Tu and their relationship has been better ever since.

Moreover, Hien Thuc was also dragged into copyright issue with Thu Minh and Hoang Le Vi. Both of them were resolved.

Discography
 2000: Bong Bien
 2000: Email Tinh Yeu 
 2000: Gui Doi Mat Nai
 2005: Bao (Thuy)
 2005: Kim
 2005: Q (Tho)
 2006: Moc
 2006: Tieng Hat Thien Than (Hoa)
 2006: Dau Co Loi Lam - single
 2006: Tron Kiep Binh Yen - single
 2007: Kim Cuong (Diamond)
 2007: Sunflower 
 2009: Portrait 17
 2010: Kim Nguu (Taurus)
 2010: Yeu Dau Theo Gio Bay - single
 2011: Thien Su
 2012: Free 3:15PM
 2012: Mother's Diary with Nguyễn Văn Chung
 2013: Tam Thang Nam
 2016: Nghe Thuc Hat

References

21st-century Vietnamese women singers
1981 births
Living people